A list of Portuguese films that were first released in 2020. Due to the COVID-19 pandemic there were significantly less films released than previous years.

See also 

 2020 in Portugal

References 

Lists of Portuguese films by year
Lists of 2020 films by country or language
2020 in Portugal